The Wernher Triptych is an ivory Byzantine triptych carved in Constantinople between 900 and 1000 AD.

History
The triptych became part of the British Museum's collection in 1978, in lieu of taxes following the death of Sir Harold Wernher, son of the financier Sir Julius Wernher.

Description
In the central panel stands the Virgin Hodegetria; on the side leaves are carved an angel and two saints framed in medallions; on the left St Nicholas and St Theodore, on the right St John Chrysostom and St George.

See also
Borradaile Triptych
Harbaville Triptych

References

Further reading
Evans, Helen C. & Wixom, William D., The glory of Byzantium: art and culture of the Middle Byzantine era, A.D. 843-1261, no. 80, 1997, The Metropolitan Museum of Art, New York, ; full text available online from The Metropolitan Museum of Art Libraries

Triptychs
Byzantine ivory
10th-century sculptures
Medieval European objects in the British Museum
Sculptures of the British Museum